Dragora GNU/Linux-Libre is an Argentine Linux distribution written from scratch sharing some similarities with Slackware. It has a simple packaging system that allows installing, removing, upgrading and creating packages, although the system may be challenging to new users. As it only packages free software and uses the Linux-libre kernel, the Free Software Foundation endorses Dragora. Dragora is considered to be based on the "Keep it simple, stupid" (KISS) principle, believed by the authors to be a strength. Dragora can be downloaded from the web site or bought on CD.

Since Dragora 2 the init system Runit is used.

Release dates 

The following list of releases includes the release date and the code name used by the project.

 Dragora 1.0 Beta 1: June 13, 2008 - "hell".
 Dragora 1.0 Beta 2: September 18, 2008.
 Dragora 1.0 Release Candidate 1: February 12, 2009.
 Dragora 1.0 Stable: March 13, 2009 - "starlight".
 Dragora 1.1 Release Candidate 1: August 25, 2009.
 Dragora 1.1 Stable: October 8, 2009 - "stargazer".
 Dragora 2.0 Release Candidate 1: January 24, 2010.
 Dragora 2.0 Release Candidate 2: March 28, 2010.
 Dragora 2.0 Stable: April 13, 2010 - "ardi".
 Dragora 2.1 Release Candidate 1: December 4, 2010.
 Dragora 2.1 Stable: December 31, 2010 - "dio".
 Dragora 2.2 Release Candidate 1: March 2, 2012.
 Dragora 2.2 Stable: April 21, 2012 - "rafaela".
 Dragora 3.0 Alpha 1: December 31, 2017.
 Dragora 3.0 Alpha 2: September 28, 2018.
 Dragora 3.0 Beta 1: October 16, 2019.

See also 

 Comparison of Linux distributions
 GNU/Linux naming controversy

References

External links
 

2009 software
Free software only Linux distributions
Linux distributions without systemd
Linux distributions